is a Japanese tuning company and racing team from Toyota, Aichi, mainly competing in the Super GT series and specializing in Toyota tuning parts.

History
The company was formed in 1972 as Sigma Automotive Co., Ltd by Shin Kato to develop and produce motorsport related parts and accessories as well as operating their own racing team.

In 1985, the racing division of Sigma Automotive became an independent company, Kato established a company called Sigma Advanced Racing Development (SARD) specializing in motorsport as well as producing aftermarket parts for Toyota automobiles.

Products 

Sigma Advanced Racing Development (SARD) develops and manufactures tuning parts mainly for Toyota cars, namely turbochargers, redesigned fuel systems and cooling systems, suspension parts and aerodynamic kits. The company is not restricted to Toyotas as they are well known within the aftermarket tuning market for their fueling components used by numerous tuning companies.

Current Product Lines 

 Complete Car
 Aero
 Wing
 Dry Carbon
 Interior
 Exhaust
 Intake & Suction
 Fuel
 Oil
 Chemical
 Cooling
 Footwork
 Body Build
 Powertrain
 Engine Parts
 Turbo
 Electronics
 Sub Parts
 Goods & Apparel

Also, under the SARD Marine Project, a separate project to its car works, it builds and sell its Toyota powered motorboats.

Motorsport 

Sigma Automotive began its racing career in the Fuji Grand Champion Series and in 1973 participated for the first time in the 24 Hours of Le Mans with their Sigma MC73, powered by a Mazda Wankel engine, becoming the first Japanese car to qualify for Le Mans, before retiring early in the race with electrical problems. The team returned for the following year with a Mazda backed MC74, finishing but not making enough laps to be classified. In 1975 the team switched to a Toyota powerplant in the MC75, only to suffer from another early retirement. After transitioning out of international motorsports, Sigma Automotive would continue to compete in numerous domestic series.

SARD returned to international motorsports in 1989, debuting as a Toyota backed team named Toyota Team SARD in the first round of World Sports Prototype Championship held in Suzuka, using a Toyota 89C-V, also competing in the All Japan Sports Prototype Championship. With the demise of Group C in 1993, SARD switched to the newly formed JGTC series and also return to Le Mans with a V8 powered MR2 known as the MC8-R, having the same spell of misfortune as they had during the 1970s, competing in 1995 and 1996, only to fail to pre-qualify in the face of the newer generations of GT1 cars in the following year. SARD also entered a Toyota Supra in first two years of the MC8-R program where it faced against fellow Japanese GT machines in form of Nissan Skyline GT-R and Honda NSX, the latter which also raced in and won the GT2 class in 1995. SARD continued to compete in the JGTC and Super GT series with works-backed Toyotas and Lexuses; the team currently fields a Toyota GR Supra under the Toyota Team SARD name. In 2016, SARD won its first-ever Super GT championship with a Lexus RC F driven by Heikki Kovalainen and Kohei Hirate.

In 2006, SARD competed in the 24 Hours of Tokachi, a Super Taikyu race,  with a hybrid powered Lexus GS450h finishing 4th in class and 17th overall. The Supra, rechristened as the Denso SARD Supra HV-R and driven by series regulars André Couto, Akira Iida, Katsuyuki Hiranaka and Tatsuya Kataoka started on pole and effortlessly dominated the entire race, completing 616 laps, 19 laps ahead of the runner-up. It became the first hybrid-powered car to win a race.

SARD planned to take part in the 2015 FIA World Endurance Championship season with a LMP2-class prototype in association with Morand Racing, with plans for a future LMP1 entry. However, SARD was forced to reduce its participation after a loss of backers before the season started; it was unable to come up with half of the season's budget, as agreed with Morand. Nevertheless, Morand continued to compete under the Team SARD Morand name during the 2015 season.

Complete JGTC Results  
(key) (Races in bold indicate pole position) (Races in italics indicate fastest lap)

External links
Super GT profile

References 

Auto parts suppliers of Japan
Automotive motorsports and performance companies
Companies based in Aichi Prefecture
Toyota
Japanese auto racing teams
Super GT teams
24 Hours of Le Mans teams
Auto tuning companies
FIA World Endurance Championship teams
Turbocharger manufacturers
Japanese brands
Toyota in motorsport
World Sportscar Championship teams
FIA GT Championship teams
Auto racing teams established in 1985